Shuangliu District is one of 11 urban districts of the prefecture-level city of Chengdu, the capital of Sichuan Province, Southwest China. It is the home of Chengdu Shuangliu International Airport, the fourth busiest airport in China. Shuangliu District is rapidly being urbanized by the growth of Chengdu and the airport's recent expansion. The district is bordered by the prefecture-level cities of Ziyang to the southeast and Meishan to the south.

History
In 127 BCE, the area was administered as Guangdu County. In 9 CE, the county was renamed to Jiudu Pavilion, and in 58 CE, its named was reverted to Guangdu County. In 559 CE, under the Northern Zhou, Ningshu Commandery was abolished and replaced by Shu Commandery and Guangdu County was once again restored. In 601, under the Sui dynasty, Shuangliu County was established within Shu Commandery.

On March 1, 2016, Shuangliu County was upgraded to Shuangliu District.

Government

District government
As a district, Shuangliu is headed by a Party Committee Secretary. On May 31, 2018, Han Yi was appointed as the Party Committee Secretary of the district. Since December 19, 2016, Chen Lin has served as the Director of the Standing Committee of the Shuangliu's People's Congress, the district's legislative body.

Administrative divisions
As of 2020, Shuangliu District is divided into 15 subdistricts and 4 towns.

Subdistricts 
The 15 subdistricts of Shuangliu District are as follows:

 Dongsheng Subdistrict
 
 
 
 
 

Wan'an Subdistrict








Towns 
The 4 towns of Shuangliu District are as follows:

 Peng
Huanglongxi



Demographics 
As of 2019, the district has an estimated population of 1,396,400, of which, 652,100 are hukou holders. In 2019, the district reported a rate of natural increase of 13.15 per thousand.

Economy
The district reported a GDP of 96.205 billion Yuan for 2019, an 8.8% increase from 2018. The following table shows a breakdown of the district's GDP:

The now-defunct China Southwest Airlines had its headquarters on the property of Shuangliu Airport.

Education

Colleges and universities
Sichuan University's Jiang'an Campus is in the county.

Southwest University for Nationalities maintains a campus near the airport.

Primary and secondary schools

Junior high school
Shuangliu Experimental Secondary School
Tanghu Secondary School
Shuangliu Foreign Language Secondary School
Dongsheng 1st Secondary School
Dongsheng 2nd Secondary School
Dongsheng 3rd Secondary School
Léman International School - Chengdu, a K-12 international school, is located in Da'an Village, Zhengxing Township, Shuangliu County.

Senior high school
Shuangliu High School
Tanghu High School
Shuangliu Foreign Language High School
Dongsheng 1st High School
Dongsheng 2nd High School
Dongsheng 3rd High School

Transportation

Road transport
The district is served by China National Highway 318.

Air transport
Shuangliu District is home to the Chengdu Shuangliu International Airport, which, in 2018, saw the fourth largest passenger traffic in China, and the twenty-sixth largest in the world.

Notable people
 Ye Guangfu (b. 1980), People's Liberation Army Astronaut Corps astronaut

References

External links
 Official website of Shuangliu County 

Districts of Chengdu